Ronald Anthony Cross (September 12, 1937, Hollywood – March 1, 2006, Sherman Oaks, Los Angeles, California) was an American science fiction and fantasy author. He published his first science fiction story in 1973.

Works

The Eternal Guardians
 The Fourth Guardian, Tor Books, March 1994, 
 The Lost Guardian, Tor Books, April 1995, 
Paperback edition: Tor Books, August 1996, 
 White Guardian, Tor Books, May 1998,

Standalone novels
 Prisoners of Paradise, Franklin Watts, October 1988,

External links

Bibliography at Fantastic Fiction
SF Author Is Dead link broken

1937 births
2006 deaths
20th-century American novelists
American fantasy writers
American male novelists
American science fiction writers
20th-century American male writers